The 1896 Drake Bulldogs football team represented Drake University during the 1896 college football season. In its first and only season under head coach Fred Rogers, the team compiled a 2–3 record and was outscored by a total of 98 to 28.

Schedule

References

Drake
Drake Bulldogs football seasons
Drake Bulldogs football